Thomas Richardson (born July 26, 1956) is an American professional wrestler, better known by his ring name, Tommy “Wildfire” Rich. He is a one time former National Wrestling Alliance World Heavyweight Champion and Smoky Mountain Wrestling Heavyweight Champion. He primarily appeared in Georgia Championship Wrestling and Memphis throughout the 1980s, as well as World Championship Wrestling, Smoky Mountain Wrestling and Extreme Championship Wrestling throughout the 1990s. He is a 1974 graduate of Hendersonville High School.

Professional wrestling career

Early career (1974–1977) 
Rich started wrestling in 1974 in the regional promotions in Tennessee after training with Jerry Jarrett.

Georgia Championship Wrestling (1977–1984)
Throughout the 1980s, he alternated his time between Tennessee, Georgia, and Alabama territories of the National Wrestling Alliance (NWA). He won dozens of NWA regional titles during this time. He is best known as one of the original stars of the TBS wrestling shows from the 1970s and 1980s. His bloody feuds with "Mad Dog" Buzz Sawyer, Ole Anderson, Ivan Koloff, The Fabulous Freebirds, and every other major heel to come through the Georgia territory made Rich one of the most popular wrestling stars of the period.

On April 27, 1981, in Augusta, Georgia, he won the NWA World Heavyweight Championship. He dropped the belt back to former champion Harley Race four days later in Gainesville. Race stated in a shoot interview with RF Video that the title switch was to ensure a power struggle in the Georgia territory, which ended with promoter Jim Barnett victorious (Barnett was a minority holder in Georgia and the booker of the NWA title, with the fan interest and boosted live gates, shored up his position).

He had a feud in Georgia Championship Wrestling with "Mad Dog" Buzz Sawyer for the NWA Georgia National Title. The feud lasted close to two years, culminating in the "Last Battle of Atlanta," in 1983, which featured Sawyer and Rich in a fully enclosed, "last man standing" cage match. For years no video of this match was known to exist; however, the full video of this match was released on WWE Network on September 5, 2016. Sawyer and Rich tried forming a team for a short period of time afterward to feud with a new team called the "Road Warriors". Rich was later directed into a feud with Ted DiBiase. They had a "loser leaves wrestling" match that Rich lost. So, Rich put on a mask & came back as Mr. R.

DiBiase insisted that Mr R. was really Rich. Then, on a TV match for Dibiase's NWA National Title, Rich visited announcer Gordon Solie during the match.
DiBiase unmasked Mr R to find that it was rookie wrestler Brad Armstrong. In all of the confusion, Armstrong pinned DiBiase to become NWA National Champion.

Memphis and the AWA (1984–1987)
Rich then returned to the Memphis area, where he formed a team with "Hot Stuff" Eddie Gilbert known as "Fargo's Fabulous Ones". The previous Fabulous Ones, Steve Keirn and Stan Lane, walked out on the territory.  They held the AWA Southern Tag Team titles in 1984, then dropped them to Phil Hickerson and the Spoiler (Frank Morrell). Afterward, Gilbert turned heel on Rich and they had a brief, but intense feud, which began on television when the two were presented with a "Tag Team of the Year" award by announcer Lance Russell and two guests. Gilbert, unaware his former partner was at the taping, badmouthed Rich, then the International Heavyweight Champion, until Rich came out to confront him. Rich immediately got the upper hand, running Gilbert into the steel ringpost several times, bloodying him in the process before the cameras went to a commercial. After the commercial break, Gilbert told Russell he wanted Rich to come back out so he could apologize to him in person, stating he was wrong for still being bitter about the break-up of the team, and was fueled by jealousy of Rich's championship title reign and newfound star status. When Rich accepted Gilbert's apology, Gilbert suddenly turned on him and rammed Rich's head into the ringpost, just as Rich had done to him moments earlier.

After competing in Southeast Championship Wrestling, Rich would again return to the Memphis area in 1987 and contribute to one of the greatest feuds in wrestling history. Austin Idol versus Jerry Lawler went on for over a year and culminated in a hair vs. hair match at the Mid-South Coliseum. Rich hid under the ring for the entire event only to emerge during the cage match, causing Lawler to lose the match and his hair, which led to a heel turn for Rich. After Bill Dundee later joined the feud on Lawler's side, it would climax with a tag team scaffold match that saw Lawler and Dundee emerge victorious and Paul E. Dangerously, Rich and Idol's manager, suffer a broken arm when he fell off the scaffold trying to escape from the fan favorites. From there, Rich went to the AWA and turned face again, engaging in feuds with Adrian Adonis and Kevin Kelly; in one memorable event that took place on ESPN's AWA Championship Wrestling, Rich and Kelly faced off in an arm-wrestling challenge when Sherri Martel, Kelly's manager, interfered on her protégé's behalf, leading Rich to retaliate by tearing off Martel's dress and leaving her in her underwear.

World Championship Wrestling (1989–1992)

In 1989, Rich returned to the Georgia area.  World Championship Wrestling, having been bought by Ted Turner in late 1988, was in the middle of a face lift and Rich was part of a host of veteran wrestlers to enter the promotion during this period. At first he was referred to as "former NWA World Champion", etc., but was soon relegated to midcard status. The push received by big names like Ricky Steamboat and Terry Funk and young talent like Brian Pillman and The Great Muta, essentially bumped older talent like Rich, The Iron Sheik and Wild Bill Irwin to the fringe. Rich would mount an unsuccessful challenge to NWA US Champion Lex Luger in a series of title matches during this time period. He even dropped a match to the much older and soon to be retired Harley Race at The Great American Bash in July 1990. In 1991, in another attempt to revive his career, he joined Alexandra York's York Foundation heel stable and became "Thomas Rich". He teamed with the other members, Terrence Taylor and Richard Morton to win the WCW Six-Man Titles. When the York Foundation disbanded in early 1992, Rich was relegated to the lower card.

Independent circuit (1992–1997)
Rich reverted to being Tommy Rich and from 1992 to 1996, he wrestled for the United States Wrestling Association (USWA), American Wrestling Federation (AWF) and Smoky Mountain Wrestling (SMW) mostly as a heel. Some of his notable tag team partners in the USWA were Doug Gilbert and Gorgeous George III. In 1995, he attempted to regain the NWA World title, from Dan Severn, but was unsuccessful. In SMW, he was a part of Jim Cornette's militia, where he was the top lieutenant. After SMW shut down, he returned to the USWA.

Extreme Championship Wrestling (1997–1999)

Rich debuted in the Philadelphia, Pennsylvania-based promotion Extreme Championship Wrestling (ECW) in January 1997. Later that year, he became the leader of The Full Blooded Italians, adopting the nickname "The Big Don" and the tongue-in-cheek gimmick of a caporegime. Rich both managed The Full Blooded Italians and occasionally wrestled. He left ECW in 1999.

Independent circuit (1999–present)
Since leaving ECW in 2000, Rich has worked on countless independent promotions as well as legends events and reunion events. In addition to wrestling on the events he has appeared at autograph signings and legends conventions.

On July 2, 2011, Rich was involved in a backstage altercation with independent wrestler J.P. Magnum at a TCW live event in Graysville, TN. Rich was allegedly upset that he was booked to lose an "I Quit" match to a manager, TCW Rhea County Heritage Champion Jay West. Rich ended up losing the match to West, before defeating Keith Hart later in the card.

On November 6, 2015, in Hanover, Indiana, Tommy Rich teamed with "The Rebel" Tom Scroggins to face the team of Big N' Tasty on NWA-Supreme's Event Three Generations of Excellence featuring another NWA former World Champion, Rob Conway, and Johnny Justice.

On December 15, 2015, Rich teamed with Bobby Fulton, Rob Kincaid, and Dallas Davison to face and beat Robert Applewhite, Steven Jones, Wade Castle and Vladimir Alexander at Rose City Championship Wrestling in Richmond Indiana.

As of 2021, he still wrestles. In the last few years he has feuded with Jerry Lawler.

Personal life
Richardson is married to Terry, with whom he has three daughters and six grandchildren.

Championship and accomplishments
All-Star Championship Wrestling
ACW Southern Heavyweight Championship (1 time)
American Wrestling Federation
AWF Tag Team Championship (1 time) - with Greg Valentine
Cajun Wrestling Federation
CWF Heavyweight Championship (1 time)
Cleveland All-Pro Wrestling
CAPW North American Tag Team Championship (1 time) - with K.C. Blood
Cauliflower Alley Club
Men's Wrestling Award (2020)
Deep South Wrestling
Deep South Heavyweight Championship (2 times)
Game Changer Wrestling
WOMBAT Tag Team Championship (1 time) - with Mike Jackson
Georgia Championship Wrestling
NWA Georgia Heavyweight Championship (3 times)
NWA Georgia Tag Team Championship (7 times) - with Tony Atlas (1), Rick Martel (1), Stan Hansen (2), Thunderbolt Patterson (1), Wahoo McDaniel (1), and The Crusher (1)
NWA Georgia Television Championship (1 time)
NWA Macon Heavyweight Championship (1 time)
NWA National Heavyweight Championship (3 times)
NWA World Heavyweight Championship (1 time)
International Wrestling Alliance
IWA Southern Heavyweight Championship (1 time)
Memphis Wrestling Hall of Fame
Class of 2021
National Wrestling Alliance
 NWA Hall of Fame (2008)
National Wrestling Conference
NWC Heavyweight Championship (1 time)
Northern States Wrestling Alliance
NSWA Hardcore Championship (1 time)
NWA Mid-America / Continental Wrestling Association
AWA Southern Heavyweight Championship (2 times)
AWA Southern Tag Team Championship (4 times) - with Bill Dundee (2), Eddie Gilbert (1), and Dutch Mantel (1)
CWA International Heavyweight Championship (1 time)
CWA World Tag Team Championship (2 times) - with Bill Dundee (1) and Jerry "The King" Lawler (1)
NWA Mid-America Heavyweight Championship (2 times)
NWA Six-Man Tag Team Championship (2 times) - with Tojo Yamamoto and George Gulas
NWA Southern Heavyweight Championship (Memphis version) (2 times)
NWA United States Tag Team Championship (Mid-America version)  (1 time) – with Tojo Yamamoto
Premiere Wrestling Federation
PWF Universal Heavyweight Championship (1 time)
Pro Wrestling Illustrated
PWI Most Improved Wrestler of the Year (1979)
PWI Most Popular Wrestler of the Year (1981)
PWI Rookie of the Year (1978)
PWI ranked him #117 of the top 500 singles wrestlers of the "PWI Years" in 2003
Professional Wrestling Hall of Fame and Museum
Class of 2021
Smoky Mountain Wrestling
SMW Heavyweight Championship (1 time)
Southeastern Championship Wrestling
NWA Southeast Continental Heavyweight Championship (1 time)
NWA Southeastern Tag Team Championship (Northern Division) (3 times) - with Bill Dundee (1), Johnny Rich (1), and Steve Armstrong (1)
Southern Championship Wrestling (Jerry Blackwell)
SCW Heavyweight Championship (1 time)
SCW Tag Team Championship (3 times, first) - with Ted Oates, Steve Pritchard and Joey Maggs
Tennessee All-Star Wrestling
TASW Heavyweight Championship (1 time)
TCW Tennessee Championship Wrestling: TCW Heavyweight Champion. Won title in Graysville, TN
United States Wrestling Association
USWA Heavyweight Championship (4 times)
USWA World Tag Team Championship (4 times) - with Doug Gilbert
World Championship Wrestling
WCW World Six-Man Tag Team Championship (2 times) - with Ricky Morton & The Junkyard Dog (1) and Richard Morton and Terrence Taylor (1)
World Wrestling Empire
WWE North American Championship (1 time)
Wrestling Observer Newsletter awards
Feud of the Year (1987) with Austin Idol vs. Jerry Lawler
Best Babyface (1981)
Xtreme Intense Championship Wrestling 
XICW Heavyweight Championship (1 time)

References

External links

 

1956 births
20th-century professional wrestlers
21st-century professional wrestlers
American male professional wrestlers
Living people
NWA World Heavyweight Champions
People from Hendersonville, Tennessee
Professional Wrestling Hall of Fame and Museum
Professional wrestlers from Tennessee
Professional wrestling managers and valets
The First Family (professional wrestling) members
The Full Blooded Italians members
USWA World Tag Team Champions
AWA International Heavyweight Champions
NWA National Heavyweight Champions
SMW Heavyweight Champions
NWA Macon Heavyweight Champions
NWA Georgia Heavyweight Champions
NWA Georgia Tag Team Champions
NWA National Television Champions